The siege of Maastricht was fought between 9 June and 22 August 1632, when the Dutch commander Frederick Henry, Prince of Orange, eventually captured the city from Habsburg forces.

Background
Following upon his success of 1629, the capture of 's-Hertogenbosch, the Dutch commander Frederick Henry, Prince of Orange marched up the river Maas (Meuse) in 1632. The aim of the campaign was an ambitious one - the capture of the strong fortress of Maastricht, which was deep in Spanish-held territory. As Prince Henry marched south, the fortified places of Venlo and Roermond capitulated with very little resistance thanks to the efforts of the Stadtholder of Upper Gelderland, Van der Bergh, who was sympathetic to the Dutch cause.

In 1632 Maastricht was ringed by tall medieval walls with a large number of towers. A few earthen bastions and demi-lunes had been constructed to strengthen the defences against artillery. A flooded ditch fed by water from the river protected the low-lying parts of the defences.

The town lies on both sides of the river Maas, which is particularly wide at Maastricht, so any attacker would have his forces split into two by the river. The garrison, commanded by Guillaume de Bette, baron of Lede, was strong, loyal to Spain and determined to resist the Dutch army. In addition to all this, there was a strong chance of a relief army being sent to Maastricht to raise the siege.

The siege

Frederick Henry arrived before Maastricht on 10 June with 17,000 infantry and 4,000 cavalry. This included some veteran English and French troops, who were to play a significant role in the siege. He at once began to dig lines of circumvallation and contravallation. These were earthwork fortifications that ran all the way round the town and were built to protect the besiegers' camps against sorties made by the garrison or attacks from a force outside the town. There were various forts and redoubts along these lines protecting the high ground or vulnerable sections. Where the lines met the river above and below the town pontoon bridges were constructed, allowing the besiegers to transfer troops and material from one side of the river to the other. The strength of these lines was to prove critical to the outcome of the siege.

Two approach trenches were made on the town, one by the English troops and the other by the French. The English and French approaches drove towards sections of the defences to the north and south respectively of the western corner of the town.	

The French approach targeted a section of medieval walls near Brussels Gate that was inadequately flanked by the works either side of it and the English approach aimed just to the south of a demi-lune in front of the walls. This siege took place long before the days of parallel trenches, so the works consisted of eccentric zig-zag trenches and self-contained batteries that formed strong points.

In response to the investment of Maastricht, Isabella (the Governess of the Spanish Netherlands) recalled her troops from the Palatinate and sent Don Gonzalo Fernández and the Marquis of Santa Cruz to relieve the town. The Spanish arrived near Maastricht on 2 July with 18,000 infantry and 6,000 cavalry, but though they outnumbered Frederick Henry's army, they were unwilling to attack the Dutch lines on account of their strength.

By the beginning of August Don Gonzalo de Córdoba was reinforced by the Imperial commander Pappenheim, who brought 12,000 infantry and 4,000 cavalry. He resolved to attack the Dutch lines and force them to raise the siege. In a two-pronged attack, Don Gonzalo made a show of force on one side of the river and Pappenheim attacked the lines on the other side. This plan was well-conceived but in the end the strength of Frederick Henry's lines of contravallation and the superior morale of his troops (who were encouraged by his presence during the fighting) decided the day. Pappenheim was forced back with the loss of 1500 men. One of the casualties on the Dutch side was Robert de Vere, 19th Earl of Oxford.

Having failed to raise the siege by force of arms, Don Gonzalez and Pappenheim decided to cut the Dutch supply lines and so starve them out of their strong position. However, the besiegers had sufficient supplies in their camps for another two months, so Frederick Henry simply ignored the relief forces' actions and pressed on with the siege.

The attackers were faced with a determined resistance from the garrison who made many sorties, particularly against the English approach, but in the end both the approaches reached the ditch. It was decided to mine the walls to form a breach and to this end two tunnels were dug beneath the ditch. A mine was detonated in one of them underneath the walls and a forlorn hope assaulted the breach on the night of 21 August. This assault succeeded in gaining a lodgement in the walls and the garrison capitulated the following morning, fearing that the town would be sacked if the attackers broke in.

Aftermath
The garrison marched out with the honours of war on 23 August and Pappenheim and Don Gonzalo, who were still camped nearby but were running low on supplies, withdrew. Frederick Henry's feat in capturing Maastricht dismayed the Spanish, who made negotiations for peace, but their resolve was stiffened a few months later by the death of the Swedish Protestant hero Gustavus Adolphus at the Battle of Lützen on 16 November.

Nevertheless, the capture of Maastricht was an important victory for the Dutch Republic. While Venlo and Roermond were lost to the Spaniards in 1637, Maastricht remained in Dutch hands, even though sovereignty over the condominium was to be shared with the prince-bishops of Liège.

References

 Parker, Geoffrey, The Dutch Revolt Penguin Books Ltd; 1990,  

Conflicts in 1632
1632 in the Dutch Republic
1632 in the Habsburg Netherlands
17th-century military history of Spain
Eighty Years' War (1621–1648)
Sieges of the Eighty Years' War
Battles involving the Dutch Republic
Battles involving Spain
Battles in Limburg (Netherlands)
Capture
Battles involving the Holy Roman Empire
Sieges involving the Holy Roman Empire
Sieges involving the Dutch Republic
Events in Maastricht